The following is a list of the 17 cantons of the Hautes-Pyrénées department, in France, following the French canton reorganisation which came into effect in March 2015:

 Aureilhan
 Bordères-sur-l'Échez
 Les Coteaux
 La Haute-Bigorre
 Lourdes-1
 Lourdes-2
 Moyen Adour
 Neste, Aure et Louron
 Ossun
 Tarbes-1
 Tarbes-2
 Tarbes-3
 Val d'Adour-Rustan-Madiranais
 La Vallée de l'Arros et des Baïses
 La Vallée de la Barousse
 La Vallée des Gaves
 Vic-en-Bigorre

References